George Joseph Maloof Jr. (born September 2, 1964) is an American entrepreneur and businessman. He is the former owner of the Sacramento Kings, the former owner of the now defunct Sacramento Monarchs, and was minority owner of the Palms Casino Resort in Las Vegas with his brothers Gavin Maloof, Joe Maloof, Phil Maloof, and sister Adrienne Maloof. He is part of the Maloof family.

Life and career
Maloof is of Lebanese and Irish descent. He was born and raised in Albuquerque, New Mexico, where his father, George Sr., operated a Coors beer distributorship. He attended the University of Nevada, Las Vegas where he studied casino management. He graduated Class of 1987 and was a member of the Kappa-Alpha Chapter of the Kappa Sigma fraternity. While at UNLV, Maloof played cornerback for the Runnin' Rebels football team. Death Row Records co-founder Suge Knight was his locker mate.

Maloof is the leading force behind the building and operation of the Palms Casino Resort just off Flamingo Road in Las Vegas, Nevada.  He has overseen the operation of hotels throughout the Southwest and California, including the Fiesta hotel-casino in North Las Vegas, the Central Palace Casino in Central City, Colorado, and the Palms.

Maloof opened his first casino in Central City, Colorado, before returning to Las Vegas to open the Fiesta in 1994. He then built the 430-room Palms resort in 2001 with family money. The hotel, which boasts more than $50 million in annual profits, boasts stripper poles in private rooms, the Real World Suite (home to MTV's reality series) and an emphasis on hiring beautiful women. "If you have the girls, you are going to get the guys," Maloof once said. The Palms has hosted the MTV Video Music Awards, NBA All-Star weekend and the Ocean's 13 premiere.

The Maloof family helped finance the horror film Feast. The four brothers have also filmed a series of Carl's Jr. commercials, which began airing on October 16, 2006.

Filmography

References

Further reading
Biography of George Maloof Jr. at IMDB.com
Celebrity Week
NBA.com
Entrepreneur.com

External links

George Maloof Jr. at tv.com 
George Maloof Jr. at hollywood.com

American billionaires
Living people
1964 births
People from the Las Vegas Valley
Businesspeople from Albuquerque, New Mexico
American real estate businesspeople
American hoteliers
UNLV Rebels football players
American people of Lebanese descent
American people of Irish descent
National Basketball Association executives
National Basketball Association owners
William F. Harrah College of Hotel Administration alumni